Saint-André-de-Briouze (literally Saint-André of Briouze) is a commune in the Orne department in north-western France.

See also
Communes of the Orne department

References

Saintandredebriouze